Massimo Fornoni (born 3 February 1989) is an Italian footballer.

Club career
Born in Rome, Lazio, Fornoni started his career with a small Roman club Romulea. He was released in 2003.

Crotone and loan to Siracusa
He was then signed by Crotone and played in its under-20 team until the 2006–07 season.

He then spent 2 seasons in Serie D for Siracusa. He won the 2008–09 Serie D Group I and finished as the runner-up in the grand final Scudetto Dilettanti. He returned to F.C. Crotone for the 2009–10 Serie B, as a backup for Emanuele Concetti and Simone Farelli.

Siracusa
In January 2010 he returned to Sicily on a temporary deal. Fornoni was the first choice ahead of Domenico Cecere. However, he was replaced by Antonio Castelli after 3 games. Castelli played 7 games ahead of Fornoni since round 27 and Fornoni was only able to play the last round (round 34). Siracusa finished sixth in Group C of the 2009–10 Lega Pro Seconda Divisione. At the start of season Siracusa was invited to play in the 2010–11 Lega Pro Prima Divisione (third division) to fill the vacancies. Since the 2010–11 season he was the backup of Paolo Baiocco. Siracusa signed Fornoni on a co-ownership deal that season. In June 2011 Crotone gave up the remaining 50% registration rights to Siracusa.

Honours
Runner-up
Serie D (Scudetto Dilettanti): 2009 (Siracusa)
Serie D Group I Champion: 2009 (Siracusa)

References

External links
 Football.it Profile 

Italian footballers
F.C. Crotone players
U.S. Siracusa players
Association football goalkeepers
Footballers from Rome
1989 births
Living people